William Augustus Sackett (November 18, 1811 – September 6, 1895) was a U.S. Representative from New York.

Biography
Born in Aurelius, near Auburn, New York, Sackett attended private schools and Aurora Academy. He moved to Seneca Falls in 1831.

Sackett studied law, was admitted to the bar in 1834 and commenced practice in Seneca Falls.

He was elected as a Whig to the Thirty-first and Thirty-second Congresses (March 4, 1849 – March 3, 1853). Sackett spoke frequently against the extension of slavery into United States territories and advocated the immediate admission of California to the Union as a free state.

After leaving Congress he resumed the practice of law in Seneca Falls. He moved to Saratoga Springs in 1857.

During the American Civil War his son William H. Sackett (1838–1864) was Colonel and commander of the 9th New York Cavalry. The younger Sackett was killed at the Battle of Trevilian Station.

Sackett joined the Republican Party at its founding and was appointed a federal Register in Bankruptcy under the Bankruptcy Act of 1867. Afterwards, he was usually referred to as Judge Sackett to recognize the nature of his federal position.

He died in Saratoga Springs on September 6, 1895, and was interred in that town's Greenridge Cemetery.

References
 Retrieved on 2008-10-19

Boston History Company, Our County and Its People: A Descriptive and Biographical Record of Saratoga County, New York, Biography of William A. Sackett, 1899
New York Times, Obituary, William A. Sackett, September 7, 1895
New York Times, Death of Col. Sackett, July 21, 1864

1811 births
1895 deaths
People from Cayuga County, New York
People from Seneca Falls, New York
Politicians from Saratoga Springs, New York
New York (state) lawyers
New York (state) Republicans
Judges of the United States bankruptcy courts
American abolitionists
Burials at Greenridge Cemetery
Whig Party members of the United States House of Representatives from New York (state)
19th-century American politicians
Activists from New York (state)
19th-century American judges
19th-century American lawyers